The Indian Council of Social Science Research (ICSSR) is the national body overseeing research in the social sciences in India. It was established in New Delhi in 1969.

Council 
The Council is currently chaired by Bhushan Patwardhan. Current members include Deena Bandhu Pandey, P. Kanagasabapathi, Sanjay Kumar, H.S. Bedi, Harish Chandra Singh Rathore, Panchanan Mohanty, Amita Singh, Kshamadevi Shankarrao Khobragade, T. Subramanyam Naidu, Rakesh Sinha, Aswini Mohapatra, P.V. Krishna Bhatta, Santishree Dhulipudi Pandit, J.K. Bajaj, M.P. Bezbaruah, D.D. Pattanaik, and Madhu Purnima Kishwar.

Activities 
It provides funding to scholars and to a network of twenty-nine research institutes, among them: 

 A.N. Sinha Institute of Social Studies, Patna (ANSISS Patna)
 Nabakrushna Choudhury Centre for Development Studies (NCDS), Bhubaneswar
 Institute of Economic Growth, Delhi
 Centre for Development Studies, Thiruvananthapuram
 Centre for Policy Research, New Delhi
 Centre for Studies in Social Sciences, Calcutta
 Centre for the Study of Developing Societies, Delhi
 Centre for Multi-Disciplinary Development Research
 Centre for Women's Development Studies, Delhi
 Govind Ballabh Pant Social Science Institute, Allahabad
 Indian Institute Of Economics, Hyderabad
 Institute of Public Enterprise, Hyderabad
 Institute for Social and Economic Change, Bangalore
 Institute for Studies in Industrial Development, New Delhi
 Madras Institute of Development Studies.
 Omeo Kumar Das Institute of Social Change and Development, Guwahati

A large proportion of its budget is spent on its own administration; in 1996–1997, this amounted to 23% of total expenditure. It has been described as an "oversized, unimaginative and inefficient bureaucrac[y]".

See also 

 National Social Science Documentation Centre

References 

Ministry of Education (India)
Social sciences organizations
Organizations established in 1969
Research institutes in India
Research and development organizations
Social Science Research
Members of the International Science Council